Konstantin Melgunov (18 December 1926 – 18 December 2013) was a Russian sailor. He competed at five consecutive Olympics, starting with the 1952 Summer Olympics.

References

External links
 

1926 births
2013 deaths
Russian male sailors (sport)
Soviet male sailors (sport)
Olympic sailors of the Soviet Union
Sailors at the 1952 Summer Olympics – Star
Sailors at the 1956 Summer Olympics – 5.5 Metre
Sailors at the 1960 Summer Olympics – 5.5 Metre
Sailors at the 1964 Summer Olympics – 5.5 Metre
Sailors at the 1968 Summer Olympics – 5.5 Metre
Sportspeople from Moscow